Verkhniye Tashly (Ürge Taşlı) is a rural locality (a selo) in Nizhnetashlinsky Selsoviet, Sharansky District, Bashkortostan, Russia. The population was 248 as of 2010. There are 3 streets.

Geography 
Verkhniye Tashly is located 32 km northwest of Sharan (the district's administrative centre) by road. Nizhniye Tashly is the nearest rural locality.

References 

Rural localities in Sharansky District